Trent McClellan (born 1972) is a Canadian stand-up comedian. Originally from Corner Brook, Newfoundland and Labrador, he has been based in Calgary, Alberta since 2004. Since 2017 he has been a main cast member of the comedy series This Hour Has 22 Minutes.

He has toured extensively across Canada, both as a headlining performer and as an opening act for Gerry Dee, and has performed at the Just for Laughs Festival, the Winnipeg Comedy Festival, the Halifax Comedy Festival and other comedy festivals. He performed a half-hour special for The Comedy Network's Comedy Now! series in 2008, and has appeared on CBC Radio's series The Debaters.

He defended Lisa Moore's novel February in the 2013 edition of Canada Reads. The novel won the competition.

References

External links

Canadian stand-up comedians
People from Corner Brook
Male actors from Newfoundland and Labrador
Male actors from Calgary
Black Canadian male actors
Living people
Canadian sketch comedians
This Hour Has 22 Minutes
Canadian male television actors
21st-century Canadian comedians
Comedians from Newfoundland and Labrador
Comedians from Alberta
Black Canadian comedians
1972 births